The Yarmuk River (Greek: Ἱερομύκης, ;  or Heromicas; sometimes spelled Yarmouk), is the largest tributary of the Jordan River. It runs in Jordan, Syria and Israel, and drains much of the Hauran plateau. Its main tributaries are the wadis of 'Allan and Ruqqad from the north, Ehreir and Zeizun from the east. Although it is narrow and shallow throughout its course, at its mouth it is nearly as wide as the Jordan, measuring thirty feet in breadth and five in depth. The once celebrated Matthew Bridge used to cross the Yarmuk at its confluence with the Jordan.

History
Yarmuk forms a natural border between the plains to the north - Hauran, Bashan and Golan - and the Gilead mountains to the south. Thus it has often served as boundary line between political entities.

Neolithic
The Yarmukian is a Pottery Neolithic culture that inhabited parts of Palestine and Jordan. Its type site is at Sha'ar HaGolan, on the river mouth.

Bronze Age

Early Bronze Age I is represented in the Golan only in the area of the river.

Abila (Tel Abil) is attested in the 14th-century BC Amarna Letters. This is possibly the case also for Geshur, assumed to have lain north of the river. Other historical cities on the course of the river are Dara'a, Heet, Jalin; and the archaeological sites of Tell Shihab and Khirbet ed-Duweir (See Lo-debar).

Iron Age
The Aramean kingdoms and the northern Kingdom of Israel, of the Hebrew Bible, might have set their boundary line along the Yarmouk occasionally. Under the Assyrian and Persian empires the province of Ashteroth Karnaim laid to the north, and that of Gal'azu (Gilead) to the south.

Hellenistic period
In Hellenistic times, the territory of Hippos was across from those of Gadara and Abila (Abel) on the south, while Dion sat on the eastern tributaries.

Byzantine period
The Battle of the Yarmuk, where Muslim forces defeated those of the Byzantine Empire and gained control of Syria, took place north of the river in 636.

1905–1948 
A fork of the Hejaz Railway (connecting to the Jezreel Valley railway in Samakh) ran in the river valley from 1905 to 1946. It was deprecated after being bombed by the Jewish Haganah in the Night of the Bridges on 16 June 1946. The hydroplant of Naharayim, on the confluence with Jordan River, served Mandatory Palestine from 1932 to 1948.

After 1948

Today, the lower part of the river, close to the Jordan Valley, forms part of the border between Israel and Jordan. Further upstream it forms part of the border between Syria and Jordan (a border largely inherited from the 1923 Franco-British Boundary Agreement). The area of Al-Hamma, or Hamat Gader in the valley is held by Israel but claimed by Syria.

The Al-Wehda Dam was constructed on the border between Jordan and Syria in the 2000s. There are political agreements between Jordan and Syria (1953 and 1987) and between Jordan and Israel (1994), about the management and allocation of the shared waters of the Yarmouk River.

References

External links

Yarmouk Hydro-Political Story Map by the UEA Water Security Research Centre
Photos of Yarmouk river at the American Center of Research

Tributaries of the Jordan River
Great Rift Valley
Rivers of Israel
Rivers of Jordan
Rivers of Syria
Hebrew Bible rivers
Israel–Jordan relations
International rivers of Asia
Jordan–Syria border
Israel–Jordan border
Gilead